Ceremony for the 4th Hundred Flowers Awards was held on May 23, 1981, Beijing.

Awards

Best Film

Best Actor

Best Actress

External links
China.com.cn
Winners List

1981